Toronto's operating municipal budget for 2010 was approved by the Toronto City Council on April 15, 2010.  The budget maintained city services, and increased the property tax by "1.8% on total tax base".

Revenues 
 Property Taxes - C$3.5 billion (38%)
 Provincial Grants & Subsidies - C$1.9 billion (20%)
 Other Revenues - C$1.6 billion (17%)
 User Fees - C$1.4 billion (15%)
 Reserves/Reserve Funds - C$  0.4 billion (5%)
 MLTT/PVT - C$0.2 billion (3%)
 Federal Grants & Subsidies - C$0.2 billion (2%)

Expenditures 
 Administration & Other - C$1.85 billion (20.1%)
 Toronto Transit Commission - C$1.5 billion (15.8%)
 Toronto Employment and Social Services Division - C$1.4 billion (14.7%)
 Toronto Police Service - C$956.2 million (10.4%)
 Toronto Shelter, Support & Housing Administration Division - C$854.7 million (9.3%)
 Debt Charges - C$430.3 million (4.7%)
 Toronto Children's Services Division - C$378.7 million (4.1%)
 Toronto Fire Services - 371.7 million (4.0%)
 Toronto Parks, Forestry and Recreation Division - C$359.9 million (3.9%)
 Transportation Services - C$285 million (3.1%)
 Toronto Public Health - C$219.5 million (2.4%)
 Toronto Public Library - C$180.6 million (2.0%)
 Toronto EMS - C$165.3 million (1.8%)
 Toronto Municipal Licensing and Standards - C$50.2 million (0.5%)
 Toronto City Planning - C$36.2 million (0.4%)
 Toronto Economic Development and Culture Division- C$35.9 million (0.4%)

See also 
 City of Toronto government

References

External links 
  www.toronto.ca/budget2010/

Budgets of the municipal government of Toronto
Toronto
2010 in Canadian politics